The Services cricket team plays in the Ranji Trophy, the main domestic first-class cricket competition in India. Under the auspices of the Services Sports Control Board, they represent the Indian Armed Forces. Their home ground is the Palam A Ground, Model Sports Complex, Delhi.

Records
The Services team first played in the Ranji Trophy in 1949–50. They played in the North Zone of the competition until 2001–02, and have played in the Plate Group and other lower-ranked groups since 2002–03, except for one season, where they played in the Elite Group, during 2005–06. Their strongest period was the 1950s: between 1950–51 and 1959–60 they reached the semi-finals six times and the final twice, losing to Bombay in 1956–57 by an innings, and to Baroda in 1957–58, also by an innings.

As of early March 2022, Services had played 350 first-class matches, with 91 wins, 119 losses, and 140 draws. 33 of their victories have been over Jammu and Kashmir.

Their highest first-class score is 250 not out by Yashpal Singh against Tripura in 2012–13. The best bowling figures are 8 for 37 by Gokul Inder Dev against Jammu and Kashmir in 1968–69.

They reached the semi-finals of the Vijay Hazare Trophy for the first time in the 2021–22 season. Their best finish in the Syed Mushtaq Ali Trophy was in the 2019–20 season, where they finished third in their group with 4 wins and 2 losses.

Famous players
Services players who have played Test cricket for India, along with year of Test debut:

 Hemu Adhikari (1947) (primarily played for Baroda)
 Bal Dani (1952)
 Chandrasekhar Gadkari (1953)
 Narain Swamy (1955)
 Surendra Nath (1958)
 Apoorva Sengupta (1959)
 V. M. Muddiah (1959)

Current squad

Updated as on 25 January 2023

References

External links
First-class matches played by Services

Indian first-class cricket teams
Military sport in India
Military cricket teams
1926 establishments in India
Cricket clubs established in 1926